Torralba de los Frailes is a municipality located in the province of Zaragoza, Aragon, Spain. According to the 2004 census (INE), the municipality had a population of 87 inhabitants.

References

Municipalities in the Province of Zaragoza